Juan Ezequiel Cuevas (born 4 June 1988) is an Argentine-Mexican footballer who plays as a forward for the Chilean Primera División (First Division) team Everton.

Career
Starting his career in 2006, playing for Gimnasia y Esgrima LP. He started to play regularly in 2009, under coach Leonardo Madelón. In July 2010, Cuevas  was sold to Club Toluca for US$900,000, soon after Toluca's championship in the Bicentenario 2010 tournament. After the season was over, on 22 December 2010, head coach Sergio Lugo announced that Cuevas was to be sent on loan to San Luis F.C. for the Clausura 2011 tournament not for personal reasons, but states his reason that his position is the same as Zinha (playmaker). In mid-2011, he was moved again, this time to Atlante F.C., where he scored 6 goals in 30 games.

After a stay in the Mexican league, in July 2012, Cuevas returned to his original club, Gimnasia y Esgrima, on a one-year loan.

Club León
On 2 December 2015, Club León announced via Twitter that Cuevas would be joining the team for the Clausura 2016.

References

External links
 Argentine Primera statistics at Futbol XXI  
 

1988 births
Living people
People from Coronel Pringles
Argentine footballers
Argentine expatriate footballers
Association football forwards
Club de Gimnasia y Esgrima La Plata footballers
Deportivo Toluca F.C. players
Club León footballers
San Luis F.C. players
Atlante F.C. footballers
Everton de Viña del Mar footballers
Liga MX players
Argentine Primera División players
Chilean Primera División players
Expatriate footballers in Chile
Expatriate footballers in Argentina
Expatriate footballers in Mexico
Sportspeople from Buenos Aires Province